Bettens is a surname. Notable people with the surname include:
 Gert Bettens (born 1970), Belgian singer-songwriter
 Sam Bettens (born 1972), Belgian singer
 Prudent Bettens (1943–2010), Belgian association football player

Dutch-language surnames